Eroni Cama Talemaisolomoni Mawi (born 2 June 1996) is a Fijian rugby player for Saracens] in England's Premiership Rugby and the Fijian national team; he previously played for Fijian Latui in Global Rapid Rugby.  His primary position is prop.

In August 2019 he was named in Fiji's squad for the 2019 Rugby World Cup.

References

External links
 

1996 births
Living people
Fijian rugby union players
Rugby union props
Fiji international rugby union players
Fijian Drua players
Saracens F.C. players